Everhard II Knight of Limburg Hohenlimburg (1298 - 11 November 1344) was the eldest son of Diederik II count of Limburg Hohenlimburg and Irmgard of Greifenstein, intended as a successor. Together with his brothers Kraft and Diederik, they have been mentioned in their father's charters since 1324. But due to his pre-death, Everhard did not manage the county of Limburg independently as count. Around 1326 he married Jutta of Sayn, daughter of Engelbrecht II, Count of Sayn Homburg. They had two sons Diederik and Johan. Their great-uncles Hendrik and Diederik had previously died without descendants, while his uncle Kraft was canon of the Abbey of Essen. That is why the brothers would become direct heir to their grandfather in 1364. Uncle Kraft, then co-regent and guardian of his cousins, took care of the transfer of the county.

The patronage of Mülheim 

In May 1330   a legal dispute arose with greatcousins the lords of Limburg Stirum and with the lord of Broich. The dispute was about  the patronage of the church of Mülheim. At the request of mediators, after examining old rights, the judge of Kettwick on May 29, 1330, ruled in favor of Count Diederik van Limburg Hohenlimburg and son Everhard. This issue was to become a source of conflict and litigation for a long time to come. This lasted until the 17th century when it turned out that there was a country-administrative political element too. In 1333 father and son Of Limburg are involved as mediators in a conflict within the of Münster family about land property. Their sister Else, her children and husband Herman of Münster were involved.

Beginning of Hundred Years' War (1337-1453) 

Everhard was involved as a knight in many armed engagements in the first half of the 14th century. The years from 1337 onwards are seen as the initial phase of the later so-called Hundred Years War. Since autumn 1336 there had been a lively exchange of messengers between the young English King Edward III (1310-1377) and continental princes. Through extensive promises to pay, the Englishman was able to sign an acreement almost with all of the great by the end of 1337. On May 26, 1337, Everhard of Limburg Hohenlimburg became a vassal of king Eduard III. Count Reinoud II of Gelre,“the Black” of Guelders, had married Eduard's sister a few years earlier. He acted in the river Rhein region as a sort of subcontractor for his brother-in-law, to recruit nobles as vassals for Eduard. On May 26 “Datum apud Westmonasterium vicesimo sexto Maii”  he was ordered to pay Everhard of Limburg 100 small Florins.

Diplomatic missions of King Eduard in the Rhein region 

Edward III.  undertook since July 1338 an important diplomatic and military missions on the continent, to obtain the French royal crown. Which he claimed as grandson of the French king. Accompanied by his representative court, on his way to the Niederwerth island located downstream near Koblenz, he had taken the route from Antwerp via Jülich, Cologne, Bonn, Sinzig and Andernach. On his way accompanied by local knights through unfamiliar terrain. While staying at the city of Cologne the town provided a protective team for the night hours. Eduard was the guest of his brother-in-law Wilhelm von Jülich. From 30 August until September 7, 1338, the English royal court stayed in Koblenz. Six bishops and 37 counts, barons and knights  also came there together . Emperor Ludwig IV appoints Eduard III at the Reichstag in Koblenz in 1338 to imperial vicar. But in April 1341 Ludwig the Bavarian took back the vicariate given to the Englishman.

Succession 

Everhard II of Limburg Hohenlimburg died on November 11, 1344, before a very large plague epidemic (1348-1350) broke out in Western Europe. His father Diederik II ensures that daughter-in-law Jutta, together with her young sons Diederik and Johan can go to live at the Steynhus estate in Heyst near Essen. She will thereby receive 1/3 of the proceeds from their property in Brockhusen. Jutta of Sayn died in 1380 at the age of more than 80 years old. In the meantime her son had succeeded as count Diederik III of Limburg Hohenlimburg and Broich. Johan as Johan I lord of Limburg Hardenberg, a castle and lordschip between the river Ruhr and the Wupper.

Marriage and offspring 

Everhard II of Limburg Hohenlimburg and his wife Juta of Sayn and had two sons Diederik and Johan.

 Diederick ca. 1328 - 18 May 1401 Married on 3 July 1371 to Lukardis heiress of Broich. He became Count Diederick III of Limburg Hohenlimburg, lord of Broich. Amtmann in Angermude.
 Johan ca. 1332 - July 4, 1410, Married Petronella of Lethmate. He became lord of Hardenberg, a Lordship between Ruhr and Wupper and was co-owner of the castle Hohenlimburg

Literature 

 Andre, E, (1996) Ein Königshof auf Reisen. Der Kontinent Aufenthalt Eduards III. von England 1338–1340, Köln/Weimar/Wien 1996.
 Bock, F. (1956) Das deutsch-englische Bündnis von 1335–1342, München 1956. 
 Binding, G.: (1970) Schloss Broich in Mülheim/Ruhr. (= Kunst und Altertum am Rhein. Nr. 23)  Rheinland-Verlag, Düsseldorf 1970.
 Mostert, R.A.: (2008) Broich: Burg, Schloss, Residenz. In: Zeugen der Stadtgeschichte / Baudenkmäler und historische Orte in Mülheim an der Ruhr. Verlag Klartext, Essen 2008.
 Korteweg, K.N. 1964.[Dutch] De Nederlandse Leeuw Jaargang LXXXI no.8 August 1964.
 Van Limburg, H. 2016 [Dutch]. Graven van Limburg Hohenlimburg & Broich.  [HVL R01 RG:date] Regesten 01 & 02.

Sources 

Bleicher, W. / Van Limburg H., 1998-2004 [German / Dutch] Neue Aspekte der Geschichte der Grafen von Hohen-Limburg und ihrer Nachkommen. In: Hohenlimburger Heimatblätter, Teil 1: 59, 3/1998, S. 81–93; Teil 2: 59, 6/1998, S. 201–213; Teil 3: 59, 8/1998, S. 281–294, 307–311; Teil 4: 63, 10/2002, S. 364–375, 386–390; Teil 5: 64, 2003, S. 210–214, 226-230 & Hefte (2004) Seite 70–79.

References 

 Charter 29.05.1330 Published in Akademische Beitragen zur Gülich und Bergischen Geschichte KREMER, J.C.(1770). Band II, seite 142. Handwriting by Schubert in Stadtarchiv Mülheim Bestand Herrschaft Broich. Urkunde 1010/1449. Summa also Published (2016) HVL R01:RG: 29.05.1330
 Urkundensammlung 1675. Nr. XIV SETHE. Legal conferences on the rights of Broich Castle. Held in 1505 Deutz, 1507 Cologne, 1512 Essen, 1515 Neusz, 1525 Cologne, 1529 Neusz, 1555 Bacharach. Summary Jur.dr. Voets 1675. Also Published (2016) HVL R01:RG: 1505-155
 Charter: 26.05.1337 First publicated Codex Germania Diplomata II Page 1578, LUNIG, J.CH. Also Publicated (2016) HVL R01:RG:26.05.1337 
 Bestand 623, Nr. 4148 (ältestes Koblenzer Stadtbuch). STADTARCHIV KOBLENZ
 Publikation Die Besuche mittelalterlicher Herrscher in Bonn SCHIEFFER, R. (1985), in: Bonner Geschichtsblätter 37 (1985) (1989), S. 7-40. 
 Charter: 1344.10.11. Leiningensches Archiv ARCHIV AMORBACH Princely Leiningen's archive in Amorbach Urkunde 1344.10.11 Lordship Broich. Also Publicated (2016) HVL R01:RG:1344.10.11

Inline Citations 

Counts of Limburg
Counts of Germany

1298 births
1344 deaths
German nobility